Anna Michelle Smith (born 12 May 1978) is a New Zealand former cricketer who played as a right-handed batter. She appeared in 1 Test match and 19 One Day Internationals for New Zealand between 1996 and 2002. She played domestic cricket for Wellington, as well as spending one season with Staffordshire. Following her playing career, Smith has worked in marketing support.

References

External links

1978 births
Living people
New Zealand women cricketers
New Zealand women Test cricketers
New Zealand women One Day International cricketers
Cricketers from Dunedin
Staffordshire women cricketers
Wellington Blaze cricketers